José Aponte may refer to:
 José Aponte Hernández (born 1958), former Speaker of the House of Representatives of Puerto Rico
 José Aponte de la Torre (1941–2007), mayor of Carolina, Puerto Rico, 1984–2007
 José Aponte Dalmau (born 1965), his son, mayor of Carolina, 2007–present
 José Antonio Aponte (died 1812), Cuban activist, military officer and carpenter.